Hey, Brother, Pour the Wine is a 1964 compilation album by Capitol Records released after Dean Martin moved to Reprise Records. It collects several non-LP singles and album tracks recorded by Dean while with Capitol.

Track listing

  "Hey, Brother, Pour the Wine" (Ross Bagdasarian) - 2:53
  "Sway (Quien Sera)" (Pablo Ruiz, Norman Gimbel) - 2:45
  "Try Again" (Bergdahl, Killman, May)
  "The Man Who Plays the Mandolino" (Fanciulla, Marilyn Keith, Alan  Bergman)
  "Memories Are Made of This" (Terry Gilkyson, Richard Dehr, Frank Miller) - 2:17
  "Peddler Man (Ten I Loved)" (Nicholas Brodszky, Jack Lawrence)
  "Standing on the Corner" (Frank Loesser) - 2:51
  "Love Me! Love Me!" (Walker, Di Chiarra)
  "That's What I Like" (Jule Styne, Bob Hilliard)
  "Solitaire" (Cuion, Borck, Nutter)
  "Just in Time" (Betty Comden, Jule Styne, Adolph Green) - 2:16

Bonus tracks from 2005 Collectors' Choice reissue

"You Was" (with Peggy Lee) (Paul Francis Webster, Sonny Burke) - 2:49
  "I'm in Love with You" (with Margaret Whiting) (Don Raye, Gene de Paul) - 2:54
  "We Never Talk Much" (with Helen O'Connell) (Nicholas Brodskzy, Sammy Cahn)
  "Relax-Ay-Voo" (with Line Renaud) (Arthur Schwartz, Sammy Cahn)
  "Ev'ry Street's a Boulevard in Old New York" (with Jerry Lewis) (Styne, Hilliard)

References

1964 compilation albums
Dean Martin albums
Capitol Records compilation albums
Collectors' Choice Music compilation albums
Drinking songs